The 2018–19 Deportivo Toluca F.C. season was the 102nd season in the football club's history and the 66th consecutive season in the top flight of Mexican football.

Coaching staff

Players

Squad information

Players and squad numbers last updated on 13 January 2019.Note: Flags indicate national team as has been defined under FIFA eligibility rules. Players may hold more than one non-FIFA nationality.

Transfers

In

Out

Competitions

Overview

Torneo Apertura

League table

Results summary

Result round by round

Matches

Liguilla

Quarter-finals

Apertura Copa MX

Group stage

Torneo Clausura

League table

Results summary

Result round by round

Matches

CONCACAF Champions League

Round of 16

Statistics

Squad statistics

|-
!colspan=14 align=center| Players that left the club during the season
|-

Goals

Hat-tricks

Clean sheets

Disciplinary record

Attendance
Toluca's home attendance per round. Estadio Nemesio Díez has a capacity of 31,000 spectators.

References

External links

Mexican football clubs 2018–19 season
Deportivo Toluca F.C. seasons
Toluca